Luís Filipe Santos Pinto (born 12 June 1982) is a Portuguese former professional footballer who played as a forward.

Club career
Born in Lisbon, Pinto started out at G.D. Estoril Praia in the lower leagues, and only reached the Segunda Liga at the age of 28 after signing for Moreirense F.C. in the summer of 2010. He went to appear in 205 games in the competition over the course of seven seasons, scoring a total of 44 goals for that club, F.C. Arouca, G.D. Chaves and S.C. Covilhã.

In the 2015–16 campaign, Pinto netted five times in 31 appearances, helping Chaves return to the Primeira Liga after 17 years. Late into the 2017 January transfer window, the 34-year-old returned to the third division and joined S.C.U. Torreense.

Personal life
Pinto's brother-in-law, Bruno Patacas, was also a footballer.

References

External links

1982 births
Living people
Portuguese footballers
Footballers from Lisbon
Association football forwards
Liga Portugal 2 players
Segunda Divisão players
G.D. Estoril Praia players
C.D. Olivais e Moscavide players
S.C.U. Torreense players
C.D. Mafra players
C.F. União players
Moreirense F.C. players
F.C. Arouca players
G.D. Chaves players
S.C. Covilhã players
U.D. Vilafranquense players
F.C. Alverca players
Atlético Clube de Portugal players
PFC Chernomorets Burgas players
Portuguese expatriate footballers
Expatriate footballers in Bulgaria
Portuguese expatriate sportspeople in Bulgaria